James Agar, 1st Viscount Clifden (25 March 1734 – 1 January 1789), was an Irish peer and politician and held the office of one of the joint Postmasters General of Ireland.

Family
He was the second son of Henry Agar, a former MP for Gowran, and Anne Ellis, daughter of Welbore Ellis, Bishop of Meath, and was probably born at Gowran Castle on 25 March 1734. On 20 March 1760, James married Lucia Martin, daughter of John Martin and widow of Henry Boyle-Walsingham. Together they had three children; Henry-Welbore, John Ellis, b. 31 December 1763, and Charles-Bagnell, b. 13 August 1765. Agar was made a Baron Clifden on 27 July 1776 and Viscount Clifden on 12 January 1781 and on 13 August 1794 became Baron Mendip. He died on 1 January 1789 when his eldest son became the second viscount and Baron Mendip. His widow died in 1802. Agar's younger brothers were Charles Agar, first Earl of Normanton (1736–1809), who became the Church of Ireland Archbishop of Dublin, and Welbore Ellis Agar, a notable art collector.

Politics
In addition to being a Member of Parliament (MP) for Gowran, for which he sat three times, from 1753 to 1761, again from 1768 to 1769 and finally from 1776 to 1777, he controlled three other borough seats through the strength of his family holdings. Between 1761 and 1776, he represented Kilkenny County and between 1768 and 1769 Thomastown. He held the post of joint Postmaster General of Ireland between 1784 and 1789 with William Ponsonby, 1st Baron Ponsonby.

References

External links
Irish Legislation Database

1735 births
1788 deaths
Irish MPs 1727–1760
Irish MPs 1761–1768
Irish MPs 1769–1776
Irish MPs 1776–1783
Members of the Parliament of Ireland (pre-1801) for County Kilkenny constituencies
Clifden, James Agar, 1st Viscount
Members of the Privy Council of Ireland
Clifden
James
Postmasters General of Ireland